Norman Dodgin (born 1 November 1921 in Gateshead - August 2000) was an English footballer  who played between 1947 and 1955. His predominant position was at defence.

Dodgin became a player-manager in 1953 while playing for Exeter City, until his retirement from playing in 1955, at which point he became a full-time manager. He was also a manager at Barrow from 1957 to 1958, and at Oldham Athletic between 1958 and 1960.

Dodgin died in August 2000. Evidence of this can be found in the Family Records Centre BMD Index & the Rothmans Football Yearbook 2001/2002 Obituaries Page

Managerial record

References

External links

1921 births
2000 deaths
Footballers from Gateshead
English footballers
English football managers
Association football defenders
Newcastle United F.C. players
Reading F.C. players
Exeter City F.C. players
Northampton Town F.C. players
Exeter City F.C. managers
Yeovil Town F.C. managers
Barrow A.F.C. managers
Oldham Athletic A.F.C. managers